= Drydene 311 =

Drydene 311 refers to two NASCAR Cup Series races at Dover International Speedway:

- Drydene 311 (Saturday), traditionally held in the spring
- Drydene 311 (Sunday), traditionally held in the fall
